Brandon Robinson may refer to:
 Brandon Robinson (footballer) (born 1995) is a Dutch footballer
 Brandon Robinson (basketball) (born 1989), American basketball player
 Brandon Scoop B Robinson, American sports entertainer